Oliver Island in the Antarctic is the largest of the Mica Islands, lying outside the entrance to West Bay and  northeast of Cape Jeremy in south Marguerite Bay. Named by Advisory Committee on Antarctic Names (US-ACAN) in 1977 for David L. Oliver, CS1, U.S. Navy, cook, Palmer Station, winter party 1972.

See also 
 List of Antarctic and sub-Antarctic islands

Islands of Graham Land
Fallières Coast